The Cairo Derby is a rivalry between Egyptian football clubs Al Ahly and Zamalek, arguably the two most successful clubs in Egypt and Africa. Al Ahly and Zamalek were named by the CAF as the 1st and 2nd African clubs of the 20th century respectively. Both teams are located in Greater Cairo and their matches are considered the highlight of the football season with a live broadcast to most of the Middle Eastern and North African countries since the 1970s. Usually the derby is played twice each season with 2 matches in the Egyptian Premier League, but it is not uncommon to find the teams meeting each other in the Egypt Cup, especially in the final, and in Africa's most prestigious club competition, the CAF Champions League.

The rivalry

Ever since their creation, both clubs have been the top clubs in the Egyptian Premier League, the country's top-flight football league. Also, it was chosen one of the five of the toughest derbies in the world according by the BBC. 

In the first half of the twentieth century.
Al Ahly won their first league title when the Egyptian Premier League was first created in the 1948–49 season and won 42 domestic league titles after that. Zamalek managed to win the league 14 times.  

The largest winning margin in this derby was 6–0 for Zamalek, which has been achieved 2 times. The first time was on January 2, 1942, in 1941–42 Cairo League, and the second time was on June 2, 1944, when Zamalek was known as Farouk back then, at the 1944 Egypt Cup Final.

Fans of both clubs can be violent when in anger, such as a match in the 1971–1972 season, which had crowd violence and caused the rest of the season to be called off. Numerous fights, injuries, and deaths have been reported before matters became more controlled due to Egypt's authoritarian regime. Yet many fights and riots still occur after derby matches between both sets of fans, leading the government to post even higher numbers of Central Security Forces troops in the stadium during the derby.
The number of fights have increased with the increasing popularity of the "ultras" movement.

Non-Egyptian referees are often flown in to officiate the derby in order to ensure impartiality. 
In 2008 , World Soccer Magazine selected the Cairo Derby as the 10th most fierce derby in the world. Besides the estimated 50 million domestic TV audience, the game is huge all over North Africa, the Middle East and the entire world. On 24 February 2020, Zamalek forfeited a league match against Al Ahly, a few days after their match at the 2019–20 Egyptian Super Cup.

On 5 November 2020, Zamalek overcame Raja Casablanca 4–1 in the second leg of the 2019–20 CAF Champions League semi-finals, and set up the historic final with Al-Ahly, marking the first time ever in their history that the two clubs faced each other in the final of an international competition.

The single-leg final was played on 27 November 2020, and Al-Ahly won the match 2–1, earning a competition record ninth Champions League title.

The Meetings

Key

League
These are the meetings in the League

Egypt Cup
These are the meetings in the Egypt Cup

Egyptian Super Cup

These are the meetings in the Egyptian Super Cup

CAF Champions League
These are the meetings in the CAF Champions league

African Game of the Century
On 27 November 2020, Al Ahly and Zamalek for the first time faced off each other in the CAF Champions League final. This match is known as the African Game of the Century as the 2 greatest clubs of Africa were facing off each other for the Champions League trophy. The match was played behind closed doors of the Cairo International Stadium due to the Covid-19 pandemic that has spread around the globe rapidly. El Solia scored the first goal of the match and for Al Ahly on the 5th minute with a header while Shikabala equalized for Zamalek on the 31st minute. after 85 minutes and 45 seconds onto the game, Afsha got the winning goal for Al Ahly, controlling the ball on his knee outside the penalty area after a clearance, before volleying to the right corner of the net and past Gabaski. Al Ahly for the first time since 2013 and for the 9th in total lifted the CAF Champions League trophy, Momen Zakaria who was forced to retire from his football career due to suffering from Amyotrophic lateral sclerosis got the chance to lift the cup for Al Ahly. Al Ahly were able to defend their title for the 2021 tournament hence lifted its 10th CAF Champions League trophy.

Statistics
As of match played 21 January 2023

Records

Biggest wins (4+ goals)

Top goalscorers

Hat-tricks

Honours

Players who played for both clubs
Due to the rivalry between Al Ahly and Zamalek, relatively few players have played for both clubs. Some of the players who have done so are listed below:

Al Ahly, then Zamalek

Zamalek, then Al Ahly

References

External links
Zamalek - Al Ahly (Results), Football Derbies
Cairo derby divides an entire nation, Reuters
Cairo giants get ready for battle, FIFA official website
Egypt's big two meet in showdown, FIFA official website
Cairo's ancient rivalry 

Football rivalries in Egypt
Sports competitions in Cairo
Al Ahly SC
Zamalek SC
1917 establishments in Egypt
Football in Cairo